Chandra Parbat South is a mountain of the Garhwal Himalaya in Uttarakhand India. It's the lowest among three peak's in the Chandra Massif. It is situated in the Gangotri National Park. It is joint 74th highest located entirely within the Uttrakhand. Nanda Devi, is the highest mountain in this category. It lies 1.3 km SSW of Chandra Parbat I  its nearest higher neighbor. Satopanth  lies 4.1 km WSW and it is 6.2 km NNE of Swachhand . It lies 7.7 km east of Vasuki Parbat South .

Neighboring peaks

Neighboring peaks of Chandra Parbat south:
 Chandra Parbat I:  
 Swachhand:  
 Mana Parbat II: 
 Kalindi peak: 
 Pilapani Parbat: 
 Satopanth:

Glaciers and rivers
It is surrounded by glaciers on both the sides Suralaya Glacier on the western side, sweta Bamak on the northern side, Both the glacier joins with Chaturangi Glacier and that later joins with Gangotri Glacier from there emerges the Bhagirathi River the main tributaries of river Ganga  that later joins Alaknanda River the other main tributaries of river Ganga at Devprayag and became Ganga there after.
The word "Bamak" is used for Glacier.

See also

 List of Himalayan peaks of Uttarakhand

References

Mountains of Uttarakhand
Six-thousanders of the Himalayas
Geography of Chamoli district